John D'Emilio (born 1948) is a professor emeritus of history and of women's and gender studies at the University of Illinois at Chicago. He taught at the University of North Carolina at Greensboro. He earned his B.A. from Columbia College and Ph.D. from Columbia University in 1982, where his advisor was William Leuchtenburg.  He was a Guggenheim fellow in 1998 and National Endowment for the Humanities fellow in 1997 and also served as Director of the Policy Institute at the National Gay and Lesbian Task Force from 1995 to 1997.

Jim Oleson, his partner since the early 1980s, died at their home in Chicago on April 4, 2015.

Honors and awards

D'Emilio was awarded the Stonewall Book Award in 1984 for his most widely cited book, Sexual Politics, Sexual Communities, which is considered the definitive history of the U.S. homophile movement from 1940 to 1970. His biography of the civil-rights leader Bayard Rustin, Lost Prophet: Bayard Rustin and the Quest for Peace and Justice in America, won the Randy Shilts Award and the Stonewall Book Award for non-fiction in 2004. He was the 2005 recipient of the Brudner Prize at Yale University.

In 1999, D'Emilio was Honored with the David R Kessler award for LGBTQ Studies from CLAGS: The Center for LGBTQ Studies

His and Estelle Freedman's book Intimate Matters: A History of Sexuality in America was cited in Justice Anthony Kennedy's opinion in Lawrence v. Texas, the 2003 American Supreme Court case overturning all remaining anti-sodomy laws.

In 2005 D'Emilio was inducted into the Chicago Gay and Lesbian Hall of Fame.

He received the Bill Whitehead Award for Lifetime Achievement from Publishing Triangle in 2013.

Works

Author
Sexual Politics, Sexual Communities: The Making of a Homosexual Minority in the United States, 1940-1970 (Chicago: University of Chicago Press, 1983; 2nd edition, with a new preface and afterword, 1998)
Making Trouble: Essays on Gay History, Politics, and the University (New York: Routledge, 1992)
The World Turned: Essays on Gay History, Politics, and Culture (Durham: Duke University Press, 2002)
Lost Prophet: The Life and Times of Bayard Rustin (New York: Free Press, 2003; Chicago: University of Chicago Press, 2004)
Memories of a Gay Catholic Boyhood: Coming of Age in the Sixties (Durham: Duke University Press, 2022)

Co-author
With Estelle Freedman, Intimate Matters: A History of Sexuality in America (New York: Harper and Row, 1988; 2nd expanded edition, Chicago: University of Chicago Press, 1997; 3rd edition, 2012)

Editor
The Civil Rights Struggle: Leaders in Profile (New York: Facts-on-File, 1979), with an introduction
The Universities and the Gay Experience: Proceedings of the Conference Sponsored by the Women and Men of the Gay Academic Union, November 23 and 24, 1973 (New York: Gay Academic Union, 1974), with an introduction

Co-editor
With William Turner and Urvashi Vaid, Creating Change: Sexuality, Public Policy and Civil Rights (New York: St. Martin’s Press, 2000)

Notes

External links
John D'Emilio collected papers from the Swarthmore College Peace Collection
National Gay and Lesbian Task Force Records, 1973-2008 (279.6 cubic feet) are housed at the Cornell University Library. Contains the presidential files of John D'Emilio.
Jonathan Ned Katz Papers, 1947-2004 (59.3 linear feet) are housed at the New York Public Library. Contains correspondence with John D'Emilio.

See also
Gender
Gender and sexuality studies
Queer Theory

1948 births
21st-century American historians
American male non-fiction writers
Gender studies academics
Historians of LGBT topics
Lambda Literary Award winners
Stonewall Book Award winners
Gay academics
American LGBT rights activists
Living people
Philosophers of sexuality
Queer theorists
University of Illinois Chicago faculty
Columbia College (New York) alumni
Regis High School (New York City) alumni
University of North Carolina at Greensboro faculty
American LGBT writers
LGBT people from New York (state)
Historians from New York (state)
21st-century American male writers
Columbia Graduate School of Arts and Sciences alumni